TRAPPIST-1f, also designated as 2MASS J23062928-0502285 f, is an exoplanet, likely rocky but under a massive water-steam gaseous envelope at very high pressure and temperature, orbiting within the habitable zone around the ultracool dwarf star TRAPPIST-1 40 light-years (12 parsecs) away from Earth in the constellation of Aquarius. The exoplanet was found by using the transit method, in which the dimming effect that a planet causes as it crosses in front of its star is measured.

It was one of four new exoplanets to be discovered orbiting the star using observations from the Spitzer Space Telescope.

The planet is an eyeball planet candidate.

Physical characteristics

Mass, radius, and temperature
TRAPPIST-1f is an Earth-sized exoplanet, meaning it has a radius close to that of Earth.

Atmosphere
According to simulation of magma ocean-atmosphere interaction, TRAPPIST-1f is likely to retain a fraction of primordial steam atmosphere during the initial stages of evolution, and therefore today is likely to possess a thick ocean covered by atmosphere rich in abiotic oxygen. Helium emission from TRAPPIST-1f (and planets b and e) has not been detected as of 2022.

Host star
The planet orbits an (M-type) ultracool dwarf star named TRAPPIST-1. The star has a mass of 0.08  and a radius of 0.11 . It has a temperature of 2550 K and is at least 7-8 billion years old. In comparison, the Sun is 4.6 billion years old and has a temperature of 5778 K. The star is metal-rich, with a metallicity ([Fe/H]) of 0.04, or 109% the solar amount. This is particularly odd as such low-mass stars near the boundary between brown dwarfs and hydrogen-fusing stars should be expected to have considerably less metal content than the Sun; on the other hand, metal-rich stars are also more likely to have planets than metal-poor ones. Its luminosity is 0.05% of that of the Sun.

The star's apparent magnitude, or how bright it appears from Earth's perspective, is 18.8. Therefore, it is too dim to be seen with the naked eye.

Orbit
TRAPPIST-1f orbits its host star with an orbital period of about 9.206 days and an orbital radius of about 0.037 times that of Earth's (compared to the distance of Mercury from the Sun, which is about 0.38 AU).

Habitability

The exoplanet was announced to be either orbiting within or slightly outside of the habitable zone of its parent star, the region where, with the correct conditions and atmospheric properties, liquid water may exist on the surface of the planet. On 31 August 2017, astronomers at the Hubble Space Telescope reported the first evidence of possible water content on the TRAPPIST-1 exoplanets.

TRAPPIST-1f has a radius about the same as Earth, at around 1.045 , but only about two thirds of Earth's mass, at around 0.68 . So, it is considered somewhat unlikely to be a fully rocky planet, and extremely unlikely to be an Earth-like one, that is rocky with a large iron core but without a thick hydrogen-helium atmosphere enveloping the planet. Simulations strongly suggest the planet is approximately 20% water by composition, much higher than that of Earth. With such a massive water envelope, the pressure and temperature will be high enough to keep the water in a gaseous state and any liquid water will only exist as clouds near the top of TRAPPIST-1f's atmosphere. TRAPPIST-1f is therefore likely to be no more habitable than any other gas or ice-giant with water clouds in its atmosphere.

Its host star is a red ultracool dwarf, with only about 8% of the mass of the Sun (close to the boundary between brown dwarfs and hydrogen-fusing stars). As a result, stars like TRAPPIST-1 have the ability to live up to 4–5 trillion years, 400–500 times longer than the Sun will live. Because of this ability to live for long periods of time, it is likely TRAPPIST-1 will be one of the last remaining stars when the Universe is much older than it is now, when the gas needed to form new stars will be exhausted, and the remaining ones begin to die off.

The planet is very likely tidally locked, with one hemisphere permanently facing towards the star, while the opposite side shrouded in eternal darkness. However, between these two intense areas, there would be a sliver of moderate temperature – called the terminator line, where the temperatures may be suitable (about ) for liquid water to exist. Additionally, a much larger portion of the planet may be habitable if it supports a thick enough atmosphere to transfer heat to the side facing away from the star.

See also
 List of extrasolar candidates for liquid water
 List of potentially habitable exoplanets
 List of transiting exoplanets

References

External links
 NASA Briefing on the Discovery of TRAPPIST-1's 7 Planets

Exoplanets discovered in 2017
Near-Earth-sized exoplanets
Near-Earth-sized exoplanets in the habitable zone
Transiting exoplanets
TRAPPIST-1
Aquarius (constellation)